Pedro de Ardanaz (or Ardanas) (1638–1706) was a Spanish baroque composer. Some of his works are preserved in Latin American manuscripts, and in the El Escorial archive.

Works, editions, recordings
 Villancico Ay aflijida dama

References

Spanish Baroque composers
1638 births
1706 deaths
17th-century classical composers